Suspension & Displacement is the fourth studio album by Djam Karet, released in 1991 by HC Productions.

Track listing

Personnel
Adapted from Suspension & Displacement liner notes.

Djam Karet
Gayle Ellett – electric guitar, seven-string guitar, guitar synthesizer, keyboards, tape, percussion
Mike Henderson – electric guitar, acoustic guitar, twelve-string guitar, acoustic twelve-string guitar, keyboards, percussion
Chuck Oken – drums, electronic drums, synthesizer
Henry J. Osborne – five-string bass guitar, keyboards, percussion

Production and additional personnel
Rob Dechaine – engineering, mixing, production
Djam Karet – production
Dave Druse – illustrations, design

Release history

References

External links 
 
 Suspension & Displacement at Bandcamp

1991 albums
Cuneiform Records albums
Djam Karet albums